Balila is a Levantine dish consisting of chickpeas that have been boiled along with lemon juice, garlic,  and various spices. It is served as a hot mezze dish. The name is also used for a different Egyptian dish made of wheat, milk, nuts, and raisins.

References

Arab cuisine
Levantine cuisine
Egyptian cuisine
Legume dishes
Wheat dishes